Acronicta retardata, the retarded dagger moth, is a moth of the family Noctuidae. It is found from Nova Scotia to Florida, west to Texas, north to Manitoba.

The wingspan is 25–32 mm. Adults are on wing from April to August depending on the location. There are multiple generations per year.

The larvae feed on the leaves of red maple and sugar maple.

References

External links
Bug Guide

Acronicta
Moths of North America
Moths described in 1861